The stock of plug-in electric passenger cars in Canada in use totaled 141,060 units at the end of 2019, consisting of 78,680 all-electric cars and 62,380 plug-in hybrids. Sales totaled 50,960 units in 2019.

The Chevrolet Volt was the top selling plug-in hybrid, with cumulative sales of 13,619 units through December 2017, and the Tesla Model S was the top selling all-electric car with 6,731 units as of December 2017.

Quebec is the regional market leader in Canada, with about 11,000 plug-in electric cars registered , of which, 55% are plug-in hybrids. Registrations in the province totaled 3,100 units in 2015, representing a market share of 0.7% of new car sales, and 45% of total Canadian plug-in electric car sales that year.

Overview by province or territory
Articles about plug-in electric vehicles in individual provinces and territories:
 Alberta
 British Columbia
 Manitoba
 New Brunswick
 Newfoundland and Labrador
 Northwest Territories
 Nova Scotia
 Ontario
 Prince Edward Island
 Quebec
 Saskatchewan
 Yukon

Government incentives

Models available

In January 2009, Hydro-Québec and Mitsubishi signed an agreement to test 50 i-MiEV, at the time, the largest pilot test of electric cars in Canada ever. The test's goal was to allow a better understanding of winter usage of the technology. BC-Hydro and Mitsubishi had previously tested a three-vehicle fleet in British Columbia. In October 2010, Transport Canada and Mitsubishi Motor Sales of Canada announced a partnership to test the Mitsubishi i-MiEV. Transport Canada's ecoTECHNOLOGY for Vehicles (eTV) Program tested two i-MiEVs in government facilities and in a variety of real-world conditions. This program aim was to evaluate the i-MiEV road performance and range. Retail sales of the i-MiEV began in December 2011,

The Nissan Leaf roll-out in Canada began with fleet customers on July 29, 2011, and deliveries to individuals began in late September 2011. , the Leaf was sold only through 27 Leaf-certified dealers for the entire country, and sales were limited to customers who live within a  radius of one of those dealers. Cumulative sales through December 2014 reached 1,965 units, and, the Leaf ranked as the top selling all-electric car in the country.

Retail sales of the Tesla Model S began in 2012, with 95 cars delivered that year. A total of 638 units were sold in 2013, and cumulative sales reached 1,580 units through December 2014, allowing the Model S to rank as the second best selling all-electric car in the country. During 2014 the BMW i3, Kia Soul EV, BMW i8 and Porsche 918 Spyder were introduced in the Canadian market. The top selling models in 2015 were the Tesla Model S with 2,010 units, followed by the Chevrolet Volt with 1,463, the Nissan Leaf with 1,233, the BMW i3 with 367, and the Kia Soul EV with 318. In 2015, the Model S passed the Nissan Leaf as the all-time best selling all-electric car in Canada.

The all-electric Renault Twizy 40 low-speed quadricycle was certified by Transport Canada in March 2016, and was scheduled to be released on the Canadian market by mid-2016.

British Columbia is the only place in the country where it is legal to drive a low-speed vehicle (LSV) electric car on public roads, although it also requires low speed warning marking and flashing lights. Quebec is allowing LSVs in a three-year pilot project. These cars will not be allowed on the highway, but will be allowed on city streets.

Sales

There were 18,451 highway legal plug-in electric cars registered in Canada , of which, 10,034 (54%) are all-electric cars and 8,417 (46%) are plug-in hybrids. These figures include some used imports from the U.S. Until 2014 Canadian sales were evenly split between all-electric cars (50.8)% and plug-in hybrids (49.2%).

The Chevrolet Volt, released in 2011, is the all-time top selling plug-in electric vehicle in the country, with cumulative sales of 6,387 units through May 2015 (representing over 30% of all plug-in cars sold in the country). Ranking second is the Tesla Model S with 4,160 units sold through April 2016, followed by the Nissan Leaf with 3,692 units delivered . The Model S was the top selling plug-in electric car in Canada in 2015 with 2,010 units sold.

A total of 1,969 plug-in cars were sold in 2012, up from 521 in 2011. Sales climbed 57.7% in 2013 to 3,106 units, and in 2014 were up 63.0% from 2013 to 5,062 units, reaching cumulative sales of 10,658 plug-in cars through December 2014. The market share of the plug-in electric car segment grew from 0.03% in 2011, to 0.12% in 2012, and reached 0.27% of new car sales in the country in 2014. Cumulative sales reached the 30,000 unit mark in January 2017.

The following table presents new car sales by year of all the highway-capable plug-in electric cars available in Canada between 2011 and December 2015.

See also

 Electric car
 Electric car use by country
 Government incentives for plug-in electric vehicles
 List of modern production plug-in electric vehicles
 Plug-in electric vehicle
 Renewable energy in Canada

References

 
Canada
Road transport in Canada